The Malek vineyard is a historical house in Isfahan, Iran. The house has been taken as tax from the people in the era of Nader Shah and was for a long time a part of assets of a rich man in the city, Haj Malek. He was one of persians in Bahrain who immigrated to Isfahan during Nader Shah. During the reign of Naser al-Din Shah Qajar Malek vineyard was confiscated by the king. The Naser al-Din Shah's successors declared it as a public asset and a part of national treasury. In the Mohammad Ali Shah's era, a Hussainiya was built in the garden and its administration was handed over to an isfahanian businessman called Malek ot-Tojar. Parts of the vineyard and its building has been destroyed during the expansion and development of the city. The remaining parts include a central yard and a dining room. Presently Malek vineyard is used as Hussainia and a permit is needed for visiting.

References 

Houses in Iran
Buildings and structures in Isfahan